The 2001–02 Phoenix Coyotes season was their sixth season in the National Hockey League, the franchise's 23rd season in the NHL and 30th overall. The Coyotes qualified for the playoffs after a one–year absence, but lost in the Western Conference Quarterfinals to the San Jose Sharks in five games. It was the Coyotes' final playoff berth for seven years.

Off-season
Defenseman Teppo Numminen was named captain.

Regular season

Final standings

Schedule and results

Playoffs

Western Conference Quarterfinals

(W3) San Jose Sharks vs. (W6) Phoenix Coyotes 
The series started in San Jose. The Sharks were victorious in Game 1 by a score of 2–1. However, in Game 2, the Coyotes rebounded and won 3–1. Games 3 and 4 went to Phoenix. In Game 3, the Sharks won 4–1, while in Game 4, the Sharks won 2–1. Game 5 shifted back to San Jose, where the Sharks would win the game 4–1 and win the series 4–1.

Player statistics

Regular season
Scoring

Goaltending

Playoffs
Scoring

Goaltending

Awards and records

Transactions

Trades

Free agents

Draft picks
Phoenix's draft picks at the 2001 NHL Entry Draft held at the National Car Rental Center in Sunrise, Florida.

See also
 2001–02 NHL season

References
 

Pho
Pho
Arizona Coyotes seasons